Ma On Shan is an elevated station on the  of Hong Kong. It is located above Sai Sha Road, at the town centre of Ma On Shan, between Sunshine City and Bayshore Towers. It also serves other residential areas like Kam Ying Court and Chung On Estate; it also serves over ten schools, and is in close proximity with Ma On Shan Park and other parks.

The pattern featured on the platform pillar and glass barrier symbolizes the abandoned iron mine that used to be in Ma On Shan peak.

History 
On 21 December 2004, Ma On Shan station opened with other KCR Ma On Shan Rail stations.

The Ma On Shan Line was renamed Tuen Ma line Phase 1 at the time. Ma On Shan station became an intermediate station on this temporary new line. 

On 27 June 2021, Tuen Ma line Phase 1 subsequently merged with the West Rail line in East Kowloon to form the new , as part of the Shatin to Central link project. Hence, Ma On Shan was included in the project and is now an intermediate station on the Tuen Ma line, Hong Kong's longest railway line.

Layout

Entrances/exits
A1 & A2: Ma On Shan Plaza 
B: MOSTown

See also
 Ma On Shan (town)

References

MTR stations in the New Territories
Ma On Shan line
Tuen Ma line
Ma On Shan
Former Kowloon–Canton Railway stations
Railway stations in Hong Kong opened in 2004